Pedal Steal / Rollback is an album by Terry Allen released on his Fate label in 1988. The album combines two soundtracks commissioned for the Margaret Jenkins Dance Company in San Francisco -- "Pedal Steal" (1985) and "Rollback" (1988). "Pedal Steal" is loosely based on Wayne Gailey, a steel guitar player who wandered Texas and New Mexico in the late 1960s-early 1970s, and one of the first that Allen heard use the instrument for rock and roll.

Sugar Hill Records reissued "Pedal Steal" by itself on compact disc in 2006.

Track listing
"Pedal Steel"
"Fenceline"
"Rodar Parar Atras"
"Rollback"
"Figure Ate"
"Home on the Range"
"Further Away"
"French Home"

References

1988 albums
Terry Allen (artist) albums
Sugar Hill Records albums